Back to Life is a studio album by English guitarist, composer and improvisor Fred Frith. It comprises five classical chamber music pieces composed by Frith between 1993 and 2005, and was performed between 1998 and 2007 by Belgian pianist Daan Vandewalle, United States percussionist William Winant, and the Callithumpian Consort ensemble of the New England Conservatory of Music, conducted by Stephen Drury. The album was released on Tzadik Records' Composer Series in 2008.

Frith does not perform on this album.

Compositions
Five of Fred Frith's works are featured on this album:
"Seven Circles" for piano (1995)
"Save As" for cello and percussion (2005)
"Bridge is Bridge" (from "Shortened Suite") for trumpet, oboe, cello and marimba (1996)
"Back to Life" for trumpet, oboe, cello and marimba  (1997)
"Elegy for Elias" for piano, violin and marimba (1993)

Track listing
All titles composed by Fred Frith.
"Seven Circles" – 2:59
Performed by Daan Vandewalle on 13 June 1998 at the Koninklijk Conservatorium Gent, in Ghent, Belgium
"Save As" – 16:10
Performed by Joan Jeanrenaud and William Winant on 29 May 2006 at Guerrilla HiFi in Oakland, California
"Seven Circles 2" – 5:08
Performed by Daan Vandewalle on 13 June 1998 at the Koninklijk Conservatorium Gent, in Ghent, Belgium
"Bridge is Bridge" – 7:16
Performed by Stephen Drury and the Callithumpian Consort on 20 September 2007 in the New England Conservatory's Jordan Hall
"Seven Circles 3" – 1:37
Performed by Daan Vandewalle on 13 June 1998 at the Koninklijk Conservatorium Gent, in Ghent, Belgium
"Seven Circles 4" – 3:45
Performed by Daan Vandewalle on 13 June 1998 at the Koninklijk Conservatorium Gent, in Ghent, Belgium
"Back to Life" – 8:57
Performed by Stephen Drury and the Callithumpian Consort on 20 September 2007 in the New England Conservatory's Jordan Hall
"Seven Circles 5" – 1:34
Performed by Daan Vandewalle on 13 June 1998 at the Koninklijk Conservatorium Gent, in Ghent, Belgium
"Seven Circles 6" – 4:40
Performed by Daan Vandewalle on 13 June 1998 at the Koninklijk Conservatorium Gent, in Ghent, Belgium
"Elegy for Elias" – 9:26
Performed by William Winant, Stephen Drury and Gabriela Dîaz on 20 September 2007 in the New England Conservatory's Jordan Hall
"Seven Circles 7" – 2:38
Performed by Daan Vandewalle on 13 June 1998 at the Koninklijk Conservatorium Gent, in Ghent, Belgium

Personnel
Callithumpian Consort ensemble
Stephen Drury – conductor, piano
Joan Jeanrenaud – cello, newspaper, metal can
John Andress – marimba
Joe Becker – percussion
Dylan Chmura-Moore – trombone
Gabriela Dîaz – violin
Elizabeth England – oboe
Benjamin Fox – oboe
Angela Park – cello
John Russell – trumpet
Karina Schmitz – viola
Benjamin Schwartz – cello
Andrew Stetson – trumpet
Nick Tolle – marimba
Jordan Voelker – viola
Ethan Wood – violin
Soloists
Daan Vandewalle – piano
William Winant – marimba, vibraphone, woodblocks, tamtam, tuned gong, large metal plate, toms, bass drum, beans, ping-pong balls, hammer and nails, metal can, etc.

Production
John Zorn – executive producer
Kazunori Sugiyama – associate producer
Fred Frith – producer
Myles Boisen – compilation, editing and mixing; recording ("Save As")
Scott Hull – mastering
Harry de Winde – recording ("Seven Circles")
Patrick Keating – recording ("Bridge is Bridge", "Back to Life", "Elegy for Elias")
Heung-Heung Chin – design
Heike Liss – photography

References

External links
Back to Life on Tzadik Records.
Callithumpian Consort homepage

2008 albums
Fred Frith albums
Tzadik Records albums
Albums produced by Fred Frith